Biernacki (feminine Biernacka) is a Polish surname, it may refer to:
 Edmund Biernacki (1866–1911), Polish physician
 Marek Biernacki (born 1959), Polish politician
 Marianna Biernacka (1888–1943), Polish martyr of World War II
 Mieczysław Biernacki (1891–1959), Polish mathematical chemist
 Stefan Dąb-Biernacki (1890–1959), Polish general
 Wacław Kostek-Biernacki (1882–1957), Polish politician and writer

See also
Bernacki

Polish-language surnames